Adil Nisar (born 1 June 1978) is a Pakistani first-class cricketer who played for Quetta cricket team.

References

External links
 

1978 births
Living people
Pakistani cricketers
Quetta cricketers
Cricketers from Lahore